The National Juneteenth Museum is a planned museum in Fort Worth in Texas. Designs for the museum were unveiled in June 2022. The museum will be designed by KAI Enterprises and the design studio BIG. The museum commemorates Juneteenth, the emancipation of enslaved African Americans, marked by a federal holiday in the United States on 19 June.

The museum is planned for the Southside district of Fort Worth in Texas. Construction on the museum is due to start in 2023.

References

African-American museums in Texas
Juneteenth
Museums in Fort Worth, Texas
Proposed buildings and structures in Texas
Proposed museums in the United States